The voiced retroflex trill is a sound that has been reported in Toda and confirmed with laboratory measurements. Peter Ladefoged transcribes it with the IPA symbol that is normally associated with the retroflex flap, . Although the tongue starts out in a subapical retroflex position, trilling involves the tip of the tongue and causes it to move forward to the alveolar ridge. Thus, the retroflex trill gives a preceding vowel retroflex coloration, like other retroflex consonants, but the vibration itself is not much different from an alveolar trill. Thus, the narrower transcription  is also appropriate.

Wahgi has a similar trilled allophone of its lateral flap, but it is voiceless. 

Wintu and Lardil are other languages with a reported (apico-)retroflex trill where the tongue apex "approaches" the hard palate, but it is not subapical, unlike in Toda. The trill has a retroflex flap allophone that occurs between vowels.

However, the exact articulation is seldom clear from descriptions.

In Fijian, for example, further investigation has revealed that the sound (written ) is seldom trilled but is usually realized as a postalveolar stop  instead. In Mapudungun, the sound (written tr) is strongly retroflex, causing  and  following the subsequent vowel to become retroflex as well.

Occurrence

Notes

References

Retroflex consonants
Trill consonants
Pulmonic consonants